Dr. Everard Inseal "Tiny" Davis (2 January 1912 – 25 October 2005) was an English sprint athlete who competed in the 1934 British Empire Games.

He was born in Worthing.

At the 1934 Empire Games he was a member of the English relay team, including Walter Rangeley, which won the gold medal in the 4×110 yards event.

References

1912 births
2005 deaths
Sportspeople from Worthing
English male sprinters
British male sprinters
Athletes (track and field) at the 1934 British Empire Games
Commonwealth Games gold medallists for England
Commonwealth Games medallists in athletics
Medallists at the 1934 British Empire Games